Ben Gulabin (806 m) is a mountain in the Mounth area of the Grampian Mountains in Scotland. It is located on the eastern side of the main A93 road between Blairgowrie and Braemar in upper Glen Shee.

Rising steeply from the small settlement of the Spittal of Glenshee, Ben Gulabin is one of the simplest Corbetts to climb due to the high level start and short distance from the road.

References

Mountains and hills of Perth and Kinross
Marilyns of Scotland
Corbetts